Hyloxalus ramosi is a species of frog in the family Dendrobatidae. It is endemic to Colombia where it is known from its type locality near San Rafael in the Antioquia Department, and from the Caldas Department, both on the Cordillera Central. Its natural habitats are sub-Andean forests. It lives in the leaf-litter. Larval habitat is unknown.

References

ramosi
Amphibians of Colombia
Endemic fauna of Colombia
Amphibians described in 1971
Taxonomy articles created by Polbot